Dmytro Kravchenko (born 25 February 1995) is a Ukrainian professional footballer who plays as a midfielder for Metalist 1925 Kharkiv.

Career
Kravchenko is a product of his native FC Vorskla School System. His first trainer was Volodymyr Plyevako.

He made his debut for FC Vorskla in a game against FC Stal Kamianske on 21 August 2016 in the Ukrainian Premier League.

International career
He also played for Ukrainian different youth national football teams.

References

External links
 
 

1995 births
Living people
Sportspeople from Poltava
Ukrainian footballers
Association football midfielders
FC Vorskla Poltava players
FC Metalist 1925 Kharkiv players
Ukrainian Premier League players
Ukrainian First League players